Omoea is a genus of flowering plants from the orchid family, Orchidaceae. It includes two known species, both native to Southeast Asia.

Omoea micrantha Blume - Java, Sumatra
Omoea philippinensis Ames - Luzon

See also 
 List of Orchidaceae genera

References 

 Berg Pana, H. 2005. Handbuch der Orchideen-Namen. Dictionary of Orchid Names. Dizionario dei nomi delle orchidee. Ulmer, Stuttgart

External links 

Orchids of Asia
Vandeae genera
Aeridinae